The Samoa Trade Union Congress (STUC) is a national trade union center in Samoa. It was founded in 1995 and has a membership of approximately 3000.

The STUC is affiliated with the International Trade Union Confederation.

References

External links
 STUC in the ITUC address book.

Trade unions in Samoa
International Trade Union Confederation
Trade unions established in 1995